Pyramidobacter is a gram-negative genus of bacteria from the family of Synergistaceae. Pyramidobacter piscolens has been isolated from the human mouth.

See also
 List of bacterial orders
 List of bacteria genera

References

Synergistota
Bacteria genera
Monotypic bacteria genera